Women’s doubles badminton event at the 1996 Summer Olympics was held from 25 to 31 July 1996. The tournament was single-elimination. Matches consisted of three sets, with sets being to 15 for women's doubles. The tournament was held at the Georgia State University Gymnasium.

Seeds
  Gil Young-ah / Jang Hye-ock (silver medalist)
  Ge Fei / Gu Jun (gold medalist)
  Qin Yiyuan / Tang Yongshu (bronze medalist)
  Helene Kirkegaard / Rikke Olsen (fourth place)

Results

Finals

Top Half

Bottom Half

References

Sources
Badminton at the 1996 Atlanta Summer Games: Women's Doubles

Badminton at the 1996 Summer Olympics
Olymp
Women's events at the 1996 Summer Olympics